Byeong-cheol, or Byung-chul, Pyong-chol is a Korean masculine given name. Its meaning differs based on the hanja used to write each syllable of the name. There are 17 hanja with the reading "byeong" and 11 hanja with the reading "cheol" on the South Korean government's official list of hanja which may be used in given names. It was the eighth-most popular name for baby boys born in South Korea in 1950.

People with this name include:
Kim Byong-cheol, South Korean taekwondo practitioner, gold medalist at the 1992 Olympics
Ri Pyong-chol (born 1948), North Korean marshal
Choi Byung-chul (born 1981), South Korean foil fencer
Byung-Chul Han (born 1959), South Korean philosopher and cultural theorist 
Byung Chul Kim (born 1974), South Korean artist
Kim Byung-chul (born 1974), South Korean actor
Lee Byung-chul (1910–1987), South Korean businessman, founder of the Samsung Group
Park Byung-chul (born 1954), South Korean former footballer

See also
List of Korean given names

References

Korean masculine given names